Operational plan may refer to:

 Military purposes, see Operation plan or "OPLAN"
 Business purposes, see Business operations
 Operational planning, see operational planning